Noel John McMahen (30 October 1926 – 10 July 2022) was Australian rules football player and a coach in the Victorian Football League (VFL).

He played in the Melbourne premiership teams in 1948, 1955 and 1956. He captained Melbourne in his last two years before taking on the captain-coach position of Rochester Football Club in the Bendigo Football League between 1957 and 1961, leading them to premierships in 1958 and 1959 and runners up in 1960 and 1961.

When he was appointed to coach South Melbourne in 1962 he became the first full-time VFL coach. He coached South Melbourne for three years.

In 2000, Noel McMahen was selected in Melbourne's official 'Team of the Century'.

References

External links

1926 births
2022 deaths
Melbourne Football Club players
Sydney Swans coaches
Mordialloc Football Club players
Keith 'Bluey' Truscott Trophy winners
Melbourne Football Club captains
Australian rules footballers from Victoria (Australia)
Rochester Football Club players
Melbourne Football Club Premiership players
Three-time VFL/AFL Premiership players